Knull is a fictional supervillain appearing in American comic books published by Marvel Comics, commonly in association with Venom and Carnage, and later retroactively established as an unseen enemy of Thor and the Silver Surfer, as he was behind Gorr the God Butcher's mission to hunt down and kill various deities, in addition to having come into conflict with the Silver Surfer via a temporal black hole through time. The character is depicted as an evil deity who created the weapon known as All-Black the Necrosword and the alien races known as the Klyntar/Symbiotes and Exolons. The character would go on to play a more important role in the Marvel Universe.

Knull has been described as one of Marvel's most notable and powerful male supervillains.

Publication history
The character was first introduced in Venom vol. 4 #3 (Aug 2018), giving a nod to a nameless being appearing in Thor: God of Thunder #6. The character would be mentioned in various issues of Web of Venom, Guardians of the Galaxy and "War of the Realms". After that, Knull was the main antagonist in Donny Cates’ Silver Surfer: Black #1.

Knull returned in King in Black as the main antagonist, which centers on his attack on Earth with his symbiote army.

Fictional character biography

Origin 
Knull is a primordial deity that came into being following the destruction of the sixth iteration of the cosmos.  He was originally content to drift through "the endless void" until the Celestials arrived and began creating the 7th iteration of cosmos – the Marvel Universe. Awakened by the "Light of Creation" and outraged by his kingdom of darkness being despoiled, Knull retaliated by creating All-Black the Necrosword – which he used to eliminate one of the Celestials. Seeing this, the other Celestials banished Knull and the severed celestial head deeper into the Void. He then used the celestial head to forge the symbiote and combined it with the cosmic energies of the head, which would eventually become Knowhere. In doing so, he unintentionally gave the symbiotes their weaknesses to high sonic frequencies and fire. He created a symbiote armor and, with All-Black, started killing the other deities, until he crash-landed on an unnamed planet where Gorr took All-Black from the incapacitated Knull.

Knull eventually reawakened and discovered he could bond his living abyss to "lesser creatures" and control their new forms as vessels. He created an army of symbiotes with himself in the center of the hive mind and used them to spread across the universe, thus establishing the Symbiote Hive and killing the "light and creation" in the process. He continued killing gods, while also enslaving others. At some point, he was approached by the time-displaced Silver Surfer who had been weakened after Silver Surfer had created a little star to free a world from Knull's control. After a brief fight, Knull was able to bond a symbiote to Silver Surfer, but the latter was saved by Ego, the Living Planet. When Knull reached Silver Surfer, he tried to defeat him and re-infect Silver Surfer with his abyss, but Silver Surfer, who had gathered the energy of the cosmos, created a star which was enough to defeat Knull.

When one dragon-like symbiote arrived on medieval Earth to claim the planet as part of the Symbiote Hive, the young Thor arrived in aid of the Viking villagers and defeated the dragon, which the villagers called "Grendel", causing the connection between Knull and the symbiote hive mind to break. The symbiotes that were scattered over the universe, now free from Knull's control, began bonding to benevolent hosts and learning about the Light. The symbiotes rebelled against their god and trapped him inside an artificial planet formed of billions of symbiotes, which they called Klyntar — "cage" in their language.

Meeting Eddie Brock 
After thousands of years, S.H.I.E.L.D. discovered the body of the Grendel and bound the pieces of the dragon to soldiers to create Super-Soldiers to fight in the Vietnam War. The procedure was dubbed the Sym-Soldier program. This reawakened Knull, allowing him to take control of the Sym-soldiers who went rogue before being captured by Nick Fury and Logan, except one piece, named Rex, which escaped Knull's control. Years later, Eddie Brock (Venom) unknowingly freed the dragon and, after a battle against Eddie and Spider-Man, the dragon began searching for Rex to free Knull. However, Venom merged with Rex and eventually trapped the Grendel in a blast furnace, incinerating it and Rex both. Afterward, the Maker and Project Oversight retrieve the Grendel's codex from the furnace.

Freed by Carnage 
In Carnage Born, after Scorn joined a cult worshiping Knull, they stole the Grendel's codex and Cletus Kasady's deceased body, and after implanting the codex inside Cletus, the Carnage symbiote's codex was absorbed by Grendel, causing Grendel to become god-like. After the contact with Knull, Cletus decided to free Knull by collecting every codex of every host who had at some point bonded to symbiotes to overload the symbiote hive mind and scatter the Klyntar. After Cletus reunited with Doppelganger and Shriek, they reformed the cult dedicated to worshipping Knull. They then returned to Doverton, Colorado, where they got the codices from citizens and animals who were infected by Carnage during Carnage USA.

During "Absolute Carnage", as Carnage grew stronger, so did the connection between Knull and the symbiotes, as witnessed when Phage, Agony, Lasher, Riot and Scream also became corrupt. Knull was finally reawakened after Dark Carnage tricked Eddie into killing him after claiming the remaining codices. Knull promptly destroyed Klyntar, manifesting a suit of draconic armor and coalescing its constituent symbiotes into a fleet of symbiote-dragons. Meanwhile, Knull was tracked down by Wraith who wanted Knull to remove the Exolon (parasites that attach to a host while feeding on their soul) from his body. Knull revealed to Wraith that Exolons were just his failed experiments on symbiotes and he dumped that "trash" in The Exoteric Latitude, he stripped the Exolon from Wraith's body turning it into his sword and kicked off Wraith into the space. Soon, he resumed his campaign against the light all the while journeying to Earth, using his living abyss to claim entire planets to his cause, while haunting Eddie with pointed nightmares, and briefly imposed his influence over Dylan Brock to ensure that he would pledge allegiance to the Symbiote Imperium.

Conquering Earth and death 
At the time when the Guardians of the Galaxy were investigating the death of Zn'rx Emperor Stote during the Galactic Council's meeting at the Proscenium and find that the Chitauri Peacekeeper and the Profiteer were responsible sometime after the events of the "Empyre" storyline, Zoralis Gupa of the planet Silnius takes an urgent call while mentioning to the person on the other side to warn all neighboring systems. He tells Victoria that it's the End of Everything as different planets are starting to die in the planets owned by the Shi'ar, the Kree/Skrull Alliance, and the Zn'rx while rendering the galactic economy fragile enough to go bankrupt. Knowing that she won't make a profit, the Profiteer teleports Peacekeeper and the bio-bomb away. While thanking Zoralis Gupa for fooling the Profiteer with the bluff, Zoralis Gupa states to Super-Skrull and everyone present that something darker than Galactus is destroying the worlds and its name is Knull. Emperor Hulkling dispatched Talos to investigate the Kree and Skrull bases that went dark with Av-Rom, Keeyah, M'lanz, Virtue, and Tarna. Two days later, a Kree/Skrull Alliance armada headed by General Kalamari finds Talos' escape pod. After recuperating in the sick bay, Talos recaps to Kalamari about what happened on his mission that involved an encounter with Knull. Talos then informs Kalamari that his distress beacon on his escape pod is a warning that Knull is coming. Outside the ship, Knull is riding a Symbiote Dragon as he swoops in for an attack.

Sensing Knull coming at the start of the "King in Black" storyline, Eddie Brock alerts the Avengers. Knull unleashes the Symbiote Dragons on Earth as the Avengers, the Fantastic Four, and the X-Men fight them even when Knull is shown to have Celestials Arishem the Judge and Tefral the Surveyor possessed by his symbiotes. When Captain America gives the command to the other heavy hitter they enlisted, it turns out to be the Sentry. He takes Knull into Earth's orbit and tried to do the same thing he once did to Carnage only for Knull to do a reversal upon being familiar with what happened to Carnage that time. Knull breaks Sentry and assimilates the Void into him upon it emerging from Sentry's body. Venom and Captain America react to this as Iron Man urges them to retreat. Knull then proceeds to have his Symbiote Dragons form a sphere around Earth to cut it off from the Sun and has the living abyss swallow some of the superheroes including Storm which Professor X reacts to. As Venom, Eddie goes to confront Knull and offer his services to him. Knull grabs Venom as he recognizes Eddie as the one who killed Grendel, then he states to Eddie that the Brock he is looking for is Dylan Brock. When Eddie begs for Knull to take him instead, Knull rips the Venom symbiote off him and absorbs it into his body while planning to absorb Dylan into him as well. Eddie is then dropped by Knull into the symbiote-covered streets below. Knull finds out where Dylan is and is about to get him when Thor arrives. Together, Thor and Dylan help free some of the infected heroes including the Hulk. Thor and Knull fight and Thor gains the upper hand until Knull distracts Thor by bringing in his symbiote-possessed Celestials and stabs Thor in the back. Knull plans to control Dylan since the latter has the Symbiote codex, but Dylan fights back freeing Cyclops, Invisible Woman, Doctor Strange, Black Cat, and the Human Torch. Doctor Strange morphs into a stronger form and together the heroes fight back against the symbiotes. Namor, Thor and Storm deal heavy damage while Jean Grey's psychic powers immobilize Knull, seeing Knull's past and realizing that the God of Light (another name for the Enigma Force) is the one thing that can take down Knull before passing out. Silver Surfer arrives to where the Enigma Force is and frees it from the Symbiotes. Knull reels in pain and Eddie is chosen to be the new Captain Universe. As Silver Surfer faces off against him, Knull recalls his previous fight against him. Through the God of Light, Silver Surfer assumes a chrome form and turns his surfboard into a sword while Knull transforms his armor into one that would enable him to combat Silver Surfer. As Knull begins to fight Silver Surfer, the members of the Avengers, Fantastic Four and X-Men charge towards Knull so that they can aid Silver Surfer. Just then, Venom appears having been transformed into Captain Universe stating that he'll handle Knull from here. As Knull claims that he has killed Venom many times, Venom manages to make use of Mjolnir and Silver Surfer's surfboard which he then merged into a battle axe that is in the shape of Venom's spider emblem. Using his battle axe, Venom starts to shred his way through the Symbiote Dragons upon noting that Knull has become afraid of him. Knull even unleashes a Symbiote-controlled Celestial to aid him, only for Venom to behead it. As Venom rips off Knull's armor, Knull states that the darkness is in Dylan. Venom then picks up Knull, flies into the air, and punches through the Symbiote barrier surrounding Earth, where Knull states that the Void is eternal and the abyss has teeth. Venom then states he doesn't care if he is right as he plunges his hand into the sun and uses the Uni-Power to vaporize Knull. As a result of Knull's death, the Venom Symbiote translates to Eddie the language of the hostless Symbiotes and the Symbiote Dragons that he has become the new God of the Symbiotes now that they are free of Knull's control.

Powers and abilities

Knull possesses superhuman strength and durability. He is depicted as an immortal being. He is able to generate and manipulate eldritch darkness, as he can manifest darkness to create weapons and living creatures, whom he calls the "Living abyss." He is able to forge different types symbiotes with various abilities, such as dragon-like symbiotes. He can remotely influence and control the symbiotes he creates. Knull is also a shapeshifter, being able to  turn his human-like mouth into fanged jaws with an elongated tongue — a feature passed on to the symbiotes. With his regenerative healing factor, Knull can recover quickly from injuries. Knull also has the ability to fly. 

He is an expert combatant, utilizing All-Black to kill Celestials and other gods, while wearing an armor made from symbiote-matter. Knull's armor is decorated with a red dragon and spiral emblem, which was based on Spiral of Carcosa from True Detective.

Despite his severed connection to the symbiotes, his influence can still be observed as when Gorr, Old Galactus, Ego, and King Loki, after being infected by All-Black, continued Knull's crusade to annihilate all existence. When Malekith bonded with the Venom symbiote he called himself the Butcher of Thor. Venom formed a similar emblem with mixed design of Knull's emblem and Spider-Woman's. Similarly, the Nameless, a group of Kree explorers, after being infected by the Exolons, had their skin slowly fade with their outward appearance now resembling Knull.

Reception

Critical reception 
Ian Cardona of CBR.com referred to Knull as a "cross between Marvel's Dracula and the main villain behind Spider-Verse, Morlun," writing, "There is an ethereal, wraith-like quality to his demeanor. He's got the appropriately haunting build, with his broad shoulders and chest covered by armor that makes him appear both regal and powerful. He has terrifyingly sharp teeth, and the signature symbiote tongue." Bradley Prom of Screen Rant called Knull one of Marvel's "memorable antagonists," saying, "It took all of Earth's heroes, along with intergalactic heroes such as the Guardians of the Galaxy and the Kree-Skrull alliance to finally stop him. However, before they all teamed up, Knull beat Silver Surfer, the Avengers, the X-Men, and more, forcing the ultimate team-up to stop one of the most powerful Marvel Comics villains in history."  

Knull received particular attention in Sweden and Norway, due to the word  being the noun form of "fuck" (referring to copulation), in Swedish and Norwegian.

Accolades 

 In 2015, Screen Rant included Knull in their "20 Most Powerful Marvel Villains" list.
 In 2018, IGN included Knull in their "Marvel's most powerful symbiotes" list.
 In 2020, CBR.com ranked Knull 2nd in their "10 Marvel Gods With The Highest Kill Count" list and 9th in their "19 Most Powerful Cosmic Marvel Characters Ranked" list.
 In 2020, CBR.com included Knull in their "Spider-Man: The Best New Villains of the Century" list.
 In 2021, Screen Rant included Knull in their "16 Most Powerful Cosmic Characters In Marvel Comics" list and in their "Marvel: Venom’s Main Comic Book Villains Ranked From Most Laughable To Coolest" list.
 In 2022, Bustle included Knull in their "50 Most Powerful Characters In The Marvel Universe" list.
 In 2022, Collider ranked Knull 2nd in their "9 Most Powerful Symbiotes In the Marvel Universe" list.
 In 2022, Screen Rant included Knull in their "Marvel Comics: 13 Most Powerful Symbiotes" list, in their "10 Best Cosmic Villains Not Yet In The MCU" list, and in their "10 Marvel Comics Gods Who Should Join The MCU Next" list.
 In 2022, CBR.com ranked Knull 1st in their "Black Knight's 10 Strongest Villains" list and 1st in their "Venom: The 20 Most Powerful Symbiotes" list.

In other media

Television 
Knull appears in the Spider-Man promo "The Secret Story of Venom", voiced by Ben Pronsky. This version created the Klyntar to serve as living weapons in his crusade against the Celestials before eventually abandoning the former after deeming his initial creations, the Symbiote Sisters, useless to him.

Video games 
 Knull and Ancient Venom (Venom possessed by Knull) appear as playable characters in Spider-Man Unlimited.
 Knull appears as a playable character and boss in Marvel: Future Fight.
 Knull appears as a card in Marvel Snap.
 Knull appears as a playable character in Marvel Contest of Champions.
 Knull appears as a playable character in Marvel Puzzle Quest.

References

External links 
 
 Knull at Comic Vine
 Knull at Marvel.com
 Knull at Comic Book Database
 Knull: Everything You Need to Know About Marvel's Symbiote God at CBR

Comics characters introduced in 2018
Characters created by Jason Aaron
Darkness
Fictional dictators
Fictional mass murderers
Fictional energy swordfighters
Fictional characters with slowed ageing
Fictional characters with superhuman durability or invulnerability
Fictional characters with immortality
Fictional characters who can manipulate darkness or shadows
Fictional swordfighters in comics
Fictional warlords
Marvel Comics aliens
Marvel Comics characters who are shapeshifters
Marvel Comics characters who can move at superhuman speeds
Marvel Comics characters who have mental powers
Marvel Comics characters with accelerated healing
Marvel Comics characters with superhuman strength
Marvel Comics deities
Marvel Comics Elder Gods
Marvel Comics extraterrestrial supervillains
Marvel Comics male supervillains
Venom (character)
Fictional gods